Robert McGhee may refer to:

 Robert James M'Ghee (1789–1872), Church of Ireland minister
 Robert McGhee (politician) (c. 1834–1893), Canadian political figure
 Robert McGhee (minister) (1929–1996), Church of Scotland minister
 Robert McGhee (archaeologist) (born 1941), Canadian archaeologist
 Robert McGhee (cricketer) (born 1963), Australian cricketer